Saurauia seibertii is a species of plant in the Actinidiaceae family. It is endemic to Panama.  It is threatened by habitat loss.

References

Endemic flora of Panama
seibertii
Endangered plants
Taxonomy articles created by Polbot